Krzysztof Żukowski (born 26 September 1985) is a Polish former football goalkeeper and current goalkeeping coach for III liga team Avia Świdnik.

Career
Żukowski began his career at Gryf Słupsk. On 12 March 2010, he made his debut in professional football as a part of the Flota Świnoujście squad. He also played professionally for FC Fastav Zlín of the Czech National Football League. In June 2015, he signed a contract with III liga side Motor Lublin.

In August 2017, he was named as goalkeeping coach at Avia Świdnik.

References

External links
 

1985 births
Living people
Sportspeople from Słupsk
Polish footballers
Gryf Słupsk players
Górnik Łęczna players
Flota Świnoujście players
Śląsk Wrocław players
Arka Gdynia players
FC Fastav Zlín players
Karpaty Krosno players
Motor Lublin players
I liga players
Association football goalkeepers
Polish expatriate footballers
Expatriate footballers in the Czech Republic
Polish expatriate sportspeople in the Czech Republic